Diego Ignacio González Fuentes (born 24 November 1995 in Valparaíso, Chile) is a Chilean footballer who last played for Independiente de Cauquenes in the Segunda División Profesional de Chile.

Career statistics

Club

External links
 Profile at Universidad de Chile
 

Living people
1995 births
Chilean footballers
Naval de Talcahuano footballers
Universidad de Chile footballers
Deportes Iberia footballers
Deportes Santa Cruz footballers
Deportes Concepción (Chile) footballers
Independiente de Cauquenes footballers
Primera B de Chile players
Chilean Primera División players
Segunda División Profesional de Chile players
Sportspeople from Valparaíso
Association football midfielders
Association football fullbacks